Jean Hepner (born October 25, 1958) is a former professional tennis player from the United States.

Hepner is notable for holding the record for participating in the longest women's tennis match in a match against Vicki Nelson-Dunbar at a tournament in Richmond, Virginia, in 1984, which lasted six hours and 31 minutes. Additionally, this match contains two other records. It featured a 29-minute, 643-shot rally, the longest in professional tennis history. This was also the longest professional match completed in a single day.  Hepner reached the second round of the 1978 US Open, the 1983 French Open, and the 1983 US Open.

See also
Longest tennis match records

References

External links
 
 

1958 births
American female tennis players
Living people
21st-century American women